Aphagia is the inability or refusal to swallow. The word is derived from the Ancient Greek prefix α, meaning "not" or "without," and the suffix φαγία, derived from the verb φαγεῖν, meaning "to eat." It is related to dysphagia which is difficulty swallowing (Greek prefix δυσ, dys, meaning difficult, or defective), and odynophagia, painful swallowing (from ὀδύνη, odyn(o), meaning "pain"). Aphagia may be temporary or long term, depending on the affected organ. It is an extreme, life-threatening case of dysphagia.  Depending on the cause, untreated dysphagia may develop into aphagia.

Behavioural classification

The following behavioural classifications result from studies performed on rats, in which lesions were made on the lateral hypothalamus region in the brain. 
Passive aphagia: An animal with passive aphagia will not respond to food if it is presented. However, if food is inserted into the mouth, the animal will chew. 
Active aphagia: Active aphagia is a complete rejection of food. The animal will physically push food away or move its head from it. One might first sample the food by smelling or tasting, then spit out anything in the mouth. Afterwards the animal will show a complete repulsion to the food. The animal reacts to food as if it is bitter or foul. 
Mixed aphagia: When presented with food, the animal initially does not react positively or negatively. However, when food is placed in the mouth, the animal demonstrates active aphagia, spitting out the food and refusing to eat thereafter.
These studies point to the function of the hypothalamus in regulating food intake. Animals in this study also demonstrated several other types of eating behaviour: "weak eating," in which the animal slowly approaches, chews, and swallows small observable amounts of food for a brief period; "good eating," in which the animal reaches normally for the food and eats reliably; and "vigorous eating," in which the animal gluttonously reaches for and devours the food. In these cases, there was either minor or no damage to the lateral hypothalamus.

Aphagia not classified under behavioral aphagia typically has a structural cause, see causes.

Causes

Aphagia is usually the result of many different diseases as well as different medical treatments. The most common causes of aphagia are:

 Aesophageal cancer – there are two types of aesophageal cancer. The squamous cell cancer from the squamous cells of the tongue or the adenocarcinoma from glandular cells present at the junction of the esophagus and stomach. This leads to a local tumour growth with spreading later. This spreading may lead to larger tumors that would result in the inability to swallow.
 Aesophageal webs – thin membranes located in the esophagus. Abnormalities can cause constrictions within the esophagus.
 Globus pharyngis – commonly referred to as lumps in ones throat
 Myasthenia gravis – the thymus gland is thought to be necessary for the deletion of auto-reactive T cells, and seems to have an important role in the pathogenesis of myasthenia gravis. In patients the thymus is typically enlarged, and contains many germinal centres with T and B cell areas very similar to those seen in lymph nodes. The tumour in thymoma associated disease is typically epithelial in nature.
 Facioscapulohumeral muscular dystrophy – even though there is not a clear correlation between the facioscapulohumeral muscular dystrophy and the pharyngeal and upper aesophageal striated muscle. Minor, and nonspecific, primary aesophageal dysmotility was present as seen in the 2008 study by Joerg-patrick Stübgen.
 Multiple sclerosis – may lead to aesophageal dysmotility 

 Chemotherapy – radiation from cancer therapy may cause a stricture of the throat leading to the inability to swallow.
 Stroke – swallowing problems can cause stroke victims to aspirate food or liquid into the lungs and cause pneumonia mostly in elderly people.
 Parkinson's disease – the mechanism of swallowing disorders in Parkinson's disease may be related to extrapyramidal and autonomic system disorders. The cardinal symptoms of Parkinson's disease: tremor, bradykinesia, and rigidity are initially responsible for swallowing, which is mainly observed in the advanced stages of the disease
 Damage to the lateral hypothalamus can also lead to aphagia, as seen in the 1978 study by Timothy Schallert and Ian Whishaw.
 Other causes might be due to depression, cervical spine disease and conversion disorders.

It is important to note that all these causes (except due to the damage of the lateral hypothalamus) are indirect.

Diagnosis

Modified barium swallow – videofluoroscopic swallow (fluoroscopy). A lateral video X-ray that provides objective information on bolus transport, safest consistency of bolus, and possible head positioning and maneuvers that may facilitate swallow function depending on each individual's anatomy and physiology. 
 Esophagogastroduodenoscopy – a diagnostic endoscopic procedure that visualizes the upper part of the gastrointestinal tract.
Esophageal motility study – a test to assess motor function of the upper and lower esophageal sphincter as well as the esophageal body.

Treatment and compensatory techniques
During the treatment of aphagia (or dysphagia), it is important to provide adequate nutrition and hydration.   If a person is not able to tolerate a regular diet, diet modifications and alternative means of nutrition may be considered.  These include thickening liquids (typical thickening hierarchy is nectar/syrup thick, honey thick, and pudding thick) or by changing the texture of the solid foods to reduce the required amount of mastication (chewing) needed or to reduce other symptoms of oral dysphagia (such as buccal pocketing or anterior loss).  Alternative means of nutrition may also be needed in more severe cases (such as when a person is deemed NPO and is not safe to eat anything orally).  In these cases, nasogastric (NG) or percutaneous endoscopic gastronomy (PEG) tubes may be placed.  Other compensatory measures may include reducing the bolus size (small bites/sips) or postural strategies (such as tucking the chin, turning the head to one side or the other).  A speech-language pathologist is one professional who evaluates and treats aphagia and dysphagia and can recommend these strategies depending on the etiology of the deficit and the location of the breakdown within the swallowing mechanism.  True treatment of aphagia/dysphagia comes from neuromuscular re-education and strengthening/coordination in most cases.  This can be achieved by use of pharyngeal strengthening exercises, thermal stimulation of the swallowing trigger and oral motor exercises.  In some cases, it is also appropriate to complete therapeutic exercises in conjunction with neuromuscular electrical stimulation (NMES) which utilizes low-level electrical currents to target muscle fibers from an external source (electrodes placed on the surface of the skin in strategic places to target muscles and nerves needed during the swallowing process).

References

Esophagus disorders
Symptoms and signs: Digestive system and abdomen